The Rugby Super League is the highest tier of the national rugby union competition in Ukraine.

Teams
RC Olymp is the 2009 champion. The participants are:

 RC Olymp – based in Kharkiv
 RC Kredo-63 – based in Odessa
 RC Aviator – based in Kyiv
 RC Epokha-Polytechnic – based in Kyiv
 Argo-NAU – based in Kyiv
 Obolon-University – based in Khmelnytskyi

There seems to be a new format for the 2011–12 season. The top nine teams are divided into two groups, although the league probably lost its professional status. There is also an additional group with four teams battling it out for the 10th to 13th spots.

2011–2012 Ukraine Rugby Superliga

See also
Rugby union in Ukraine

References

Rugby union competitions in Ukraine
Rug
Sports leagues established in 2005
2005 establishments in Ukraine
Rugby union leagues in Europe
Rugby union
Professional sports leagues in Ukraine